90 Minutes in Heaven is a 2004 Christian book written by Don Piper with Cecil Murphey. The book documents the author's death and resurrection experience in 1989. 90 Minutes in Heaven remained on the New York Times Bestseller List for more than five years and has sold over six million copies. The book has also been adapted into a feature-length film, released in theaters on September 11, 2015.

Summary
On January 18, 1989, Baptist minister Don Piper was on his way home from a conference in Texas when a semi-trailer truck struck his Ford Escort while crossing a bridge. Piper describes that he was crushed by the roof of his car, the steering wheel impaled his chest, and the dashboard collapsed on his legs. When paramedics arrived, they could not find any sign of life in Piper and covered him with a tarp leaving him there from 11:45am until 1:15pm as a fellow pastor prayed over him while waiting for the medical examiner to arrive. According to Piper, he went straight to Heaven and experienced things he describes as amazing and beautiful, including meeting family members such as his great-grandmother and joining a heavenly choir that proceeded into the Gates of Heaven. Piper, an ordained minister since 1985, has recounted his narrative before 3,000 live audiences that included more than 1.5 million people altogether, and has appeared on numerous television and radio programs.

See also
23 Minutes in Hell, 2006 book by Bill Wiese recounting the author's experiences in Hell in 1998
Eben Alexander, author of the 2012 book Proof of Heaven: A Neurosurgeon's Journey into the Afterlife
The Boy Who Came Back From Heaven, a fabricated account of a near-death experience
Heaven Is for Real: A Little Boy's Astounding Story of His Trip to Heaven and Back, 2010 book by Todd Burpo and Lynn Vincent about a near-death experience reported by Burpo's then-four-year-old son, Colton
Howard Storm, author of the book My Descent Into Death about his near-death experience
Pam Reynolds case
Referenced in Imagine Heaven, a book by John Burke that summarizes over 1000 near-death experiences and compares them with the Bible

References

Further reading

External links 
 Website for the book
 Critical Review on book

2004 non-fiction books
Non-fiction books adapted into films
Books about near-death experiences
Novels set in heaven
Christian literature
English-language books